Ödön Lendvay (24 January 1943 – 26 October 1990) was a Hungarian basketball player. He competed in the men's tournament at the 1964 Summer Olympics.

References

1943 births
1990 deaths
Hungarian men's basketball players
Olympic basketball players of Hungary
Basketball players at the 1964 Summer Olympics
Basketball players from Budapest